Lichk is a village in the Meghri Municipality of the Syunik Province in Armenia.

Demographics 
The Statistical Committee of Armenia reported its population as 161 in 2011, down from 201 at the 2001 census.

Nature
The vicinity of the village was designated as a Prime Butterfly Area by the Butterfly Conservation Armenia organization, due to rich species diversity that includes number of rare and endangered butterflies, such as Pyrgus alveus, Pyrgus jupei, Parnassius mnemosyne, Parnassius apollo, Pieris bryoniae, Colias thisoa, Erebia graucasica, Satyrus effendi, Boloria caucasica, Phengaris arion, Eumedonia eumedon, Polyommatus dorylas, Polyommatus damon, and Polyommatus altivagans.

Gallery

References 

Populated places in Syunik Province